Charles Tracy may refer to: 

Charles Tracy (art historian) (born 1938)
Charles H. Tracy (1833–1911), Union Army soldier
Charles Tracey (1847–1905), U.S. Representative from New York